Matchwood Township is a civil township of Ontonagon County in the U.S. state of Michigan. The population was 90 at the 2020 census.

Communities 
It was named for the Diamond Match Company, which owned most of the pine forest in the area. The company founded the settlement in 1888 to provide for logging camps. It received a Post Office in 1889 and was nearly destroyed by a forest fire in 1893. The community was rebuilt, only to be ruined by another fire in 1906. The Duluth, South Shore and Atlantic Railway (now the Soo Line Railroad) passed through the settlement.

Geography

Demographics
As of the census of 2000, there were 115 people, 52 households, and 33 families residing in the township. The population density was 1.1 per square mile (0.4/km2). There were 153 housing units at an average density of 1.4 per square mile (0.5/km2). The racial makeup of the township was 97.39% White, and 2.61% from two or more races.

There were 52 households, out of which 19.2% had children under the age of 18 living with them, 55.8% were married couples living together, 3.8% had a female householder with no husband present, and 36.5% were non-families. 32.7% of all households were made up of individuals, and 19.2% had someone living alone who was 65 years of age or older. The average household size was 2.21 and the average family size was 2.70.

In the township the population was spread out, with 20.9% under the age of 18, 5.2% from 18 to 24, 18.3% from 25 to 44, 37.4% from 45 to 64, and 18.3% who were 65 years of age or older. The median age was 48 years. For every 100 females, there were 105.4 males. For every 100 females age 18 and over, there were 97.8 males.

The median income for a household in the township was $18,125, and the median income for a family was $33,125. Males had a median income of $38,333 versus $18,750 for females. The per capita income for the township was $15,190. There were 16.1% of families and 25.2% of the population living below the poverty line, including 75.0% of under eighteens and 7.4% of those over 64.

References

Townships in Ontonagon County, Michigan
Townships in Michigan